Akeem is a name of Arabic origin, being a variation of Hakeem, and commonly used in Africa and among the African diaspora. Persons with the name Akeem include:

 Akeem Adams (1991–2013), Trinidadian footballer
 Akeem Anifowoshe (1968–1994), Nigerian boxer
 Akeem Auguste (born 1989), American football player
 Akeem Ayers (born 1989), American football player
 Akeem Bostick (born 1995), American baseball player
 Akeem Davis (born 1989), American football player
 Akeem Davis-Gaither (born 1997), American football player
 Akeem Dent (born 1987), American football player
 Akeem Dodson (born 1987), American cricketer
 Akeem Foster (born 1987), Canadian football player
 Akeem Garcia (born 1996), Trinidadian footballer
 Akeem Haynes (born 1992), Canadian sprinter
 Akeem Hunt (born 1993), American football player
 Akeem Jordan (born 1985), American football player
 Akeem Latifu (born 1989), Nigerian footballer
 Akeem Omolade (born 1983), Nigerian footballer
 Akeem Priestley (born 1985), Jamaican footballer
 Akeem Richmond (born 1991), American basketball player
 Akeem Shavers (born 1990), American football player
 Akeem Spence (born 1991), American football player
 Akeem Thomas (born 1990), Antiguan footballer
 Akeem Vargas (born 1990), German basketball player
 Hakeem Olajuwon (born 1963), Nigerian-American basketball player born Akeem Olajuwon
 One Man Gang (born 1960), American professional wrestler, also appearing as "Akeem the African Dream"

Fictional characters
 Akeem Joffer, the protagonist of Coming to America and its sequel

See also
 Akim

Arabic masculine given names